Jakub Ćwiek (born 24 June 1982 in Opole) is a Polish fantasy writer.

He debuted in 2005 with the short story collection Kłamca (Liar). The short story Cicha noc (Silent Night) contained in the book was nominated to the Janusz A. Zajdel Award.

Bibliography

Short story collections 
 Gotuj z papieżem. (2009)

Novels 
 Liżąc ostrze. (2007)
 Ciemność płonie. (2008)
 Ofensywa szulerów. (2009)
 Krzyż Południa. Rozdroża. (2010)

Kłamca (The Liar) series 
 Kłamca. (2005)
 Anioł Stróż
 Młot, wąż i skała
 Samobójca
 Krew Baranka
 Cleaner
 Przepowiednia
 Galeria
 Cicha noc
 Egzorcysta
 Głupiec na wzgórzu
 Kłamca 2. Bóg marnotrawny. (2006)
 Okazja
 Korona stworzenia
 Odległość Anioła
 Idźcie, jesteście posłani
 Słudzy Metatrona
 Bóg marnotrawny
 Kłamca 3. Ochłap sztandaru. (2008)
 Kłamca – audiobook by Krzysztof Banaszyk (2010)
 Kłamca 4. Kill'em all. (2012)
 Część I: Wszyscy mają się dobrze
 Rozdział 1-6
 Część II: Ups... Już nie
 Rozdział 7-10
 Część III: Dokąd prowadzą wszystkie drogi
 Rozdział 11-16
 Część IV: Grand finale
 Rozdział 17-18 Awards 
For the story Bajka o trybach i powrotach, Ćwiek received the award of Janusz A. Zajdel in the category of short story in 2011. The presentation of the statue took place at  Polconia in Wrocław.

He was nominated for the award of Janusz A. Zajdel ten times:

 in 2015 for the novel Chłopcy 3: Zguba 
 in 2012 for the novel: Kłamca 4: Kill 'Em All as well as the stories: Będziesz to prać!, Co było, a nie jest... i Kukuryku! in 2011 for the story: Bajka o trybach i powrotach (received the award)
 in 2010 for the novel:  Krzyż Południa. Rozdroża and the story: Małpki z liści in 2006 for the story: Bóg marnotrawny In 2005 for the story: Cicha noc''
Ćwiek was also nominated for Artist of the Year for Śląkfy for the year 2012.

References

1982 births
Living people
Polish fantasy writers
People from Opole